Novotazlarovo (Yañı Taźlar) is a rural locality (a village) in Tazlarovsky Selsoviet, Burayevsky District, Bashkortostan, Russia. The population was 405 as of 2010. There are six streets.

Geography 
Novotazlarovo is located 14 km east of Burayevo (the district's administrative centre) by road. Utyaganovo is the nearest rural locality.

References 

Rural localities in Burayevsky District